Ángel Trujillo Canorea (born 8 September 1987) is a Spanish professional footballer who plays as a central defender.

He spent the better part of his career with Almería, having arrived at the club in 2007.

Club career
Born in San Fernando de Henares, Community of Madrid, Trujillo started playing as a senior with CD Guadalajara in the Tercera División, moving in early 2007 to the regional leagues with CD Azuqueca. In the summer, he returned to the fourth division and signed with UD Almería's reserves.

On 18 March 2012, Trujillo made his first-team debut with the Andalusians, featuring the first half of a 1–1 Segunda División away draw against Real Valladolid. On 27 May, he played his second game with the main squad and in the competition, a 1–0 away victory over former side Guadalajara.

In June 2012, it was announced that Trujillo would be promoted to Almería's first team for 2012–13. Despite missing the start of the season, he was handed a start on 8 September in a 3–0 away defeat against CE Sabadell FC, but soon established himself as a regular due to Hernán Pellerano's legal problems, and contributed 31 matches as they obtained promotion in the play-offs.

On 12 July 2013, Trujillo renewed his link with Almería until 2017. He made his La Liga debut on 19 August, starting in a 2–3 home loss to Villarreal CF.

Trujillo scored his first goal as a professional on 2 March 2014, netting from a corner kick but in a 4–1 defeat at FC Barcelona. On 7 August 2015, he moved to fellow top-tier club Levante UD after agreeing to a four-year deal.

On 5 August 2016, after struggling with injuries and suffering relegation, Trujillo returned to Almería on a three-year contract.

Club statistics

References

External links

 

1987 births
Living people
Spanish footballers
Footballers from the Community of Madrid
Association football defenders
La Liga players
Segunda División players
Segunda División B players
Tercera División players
Divisiones Regionales de Fútbol players
CD Guadalajara (Spain) footballers
UD Almería B players
UD Almería players
Levante UD footballers